Paul Taylor, born in Newcastle, is a British director of the award-winning documentary film We Are Together. In 2020, he directed The Art of Political Murder, about the 1998 killing of Guatemalan Bishop Juan Gerardi Conedera.

Biography 
Paul Taylor studied film at the Arts University Bournemouth. He did some volunteering work in the Agape Orphanage in South Africa in 2003 and started shooting We Are Together while he was still a student. It took him four years to complete the documentary.

References

External links
 Official site of the movie
 

British film directors
Living people
Year of birth missing (living people)
Place of birth missing (living people)